Sindyana  is a Syrian village located in Al-Ziyarah Nahiyah in Al-Suqaylabiyah District, Hama.  According to the Syria Central Bureau of Statistics (CBS), Sindyana had a population of 117 in the 2004 census.

References 

Populated places in al-Suqaylabiyah District